Tsvetelin Radev (born 21 December 1988) is a Bulgarian footballer who plays as a defender for Krumovgrad.

References

External links
 

Bulgarian footballers
1988 births
Living people
Footballers from Plovdiv
Association football defenders
PFC Lokomotiv Plovdiv players
PFC Nesebar players
OFC Vihren Sandanski players
FC Septemvri Simitli players
FC Vereya players
PFC Spartak Pleven players
FC Botev Galabovo players
PFC Dobrudzha Dobrich players
FC Krumovgrad players
First Professional Football League (Bulgaria) players
Second Professional Football League (Bulgaria) players